A collective title is an expression by which two or more pieces of legislation may, under the law of the United Kingdom, be cited together.  A famous example is the Parliament Acts 1911 and 1949.

Construction of references to citation with a group of Acts that have a collective title
Section 2(2) of the Short Titles Act 1896 reads:

This provision is derived from section 1(3) of the Short Titles Act 1892.

Effect of repeal
Section 19(2) of the Interpretation Act 1978 does not authorise the continued use of a collective title previously authorised by a repealed enactment.

See also
Short title

References
Halsbury's Laws of England. Fourth Edition. Reissue. Butterworths. London. 1995. Volume 44(1). Paragraph 1254 at page 742.
Bennion, Francis. Statutory Interpretation. Second Edition. 1992. s 262.

Statutory law